A sleeper hold may refer to:
A type of chokehold
A pre-MMA term for a version of the rear naked choke used in professional wrestling matches